Myddle, Broughton and Harmer Hill is a civil parish in Shropshire, England. The population of this civil parish at the 2011 Census was 1,333.

The parish was created as the result of a merger of two older parishes - Myddle and Broughton. It was originally known as Myddle and Broughton, until it was renamed in 2015 to recognise of the significance of the village of Harmer Hill, which together with Myddle is the other main population centre in the parish.

References

External links 

  (Parish council).

Civil parishes in Shropshire